or  (1570 – September 30, 1633) was a prominently placed figure in the late Sengoku period. She was daughter of Oichi and Nagamasa Azai, and the sister of Yodo-dono and Oeyo. Alongside her sisters, she was active in the political intrigues of her day. Ohatsu's close family ties to both the Toyotomi clan and the Tokugawa clan uniquely positioned her to serve as a conduit between the rivals. She acted as a liaison until 1615 in the siege of Osaka, when the Tokugawa eliminated the Toyotomi.

Life 
Ohatsu was the second daughter of Azai Nagamasa. Her mother, Oichi, was the youngest sister of Oda Nobunaga.

Her father died during the siege of Odani in 1573 after rebelling against Nobunaga, and Ohatsu's brother Manpukumaru was killed. With her sisters and her mother, she joined the Oda clan. In 1582, after the assassination of her uncle in Honnō-ji Incident, her mother married Shibata Katsuie, a general in the service of the Oda, and in 1583, Toyotomi Hideyoshi attacked the Kitanosho castle, the castle that Ohatsu lived with her foster father, Katsuie. Her mother died and Hideyoshi took Ohatsu and her sisters under his care.

When she married her cousin Kyōgoku Takatsugu in 1587, he was a daimyō in Ōmi Province, holding Ōtsu Castle for the Toyotomi.  At this point, Takatsugu was a fudai daimyō (hereditary vassal) of the Toyotomi with a stipend of 60,000 koku annually.  After 1600, Takatsugu's allegiances had been transferred to the Tokugawa; and he was rewarded with the fief of Obama in Wakasa Province and an enhanced income of 92,000 koku annually.

The changing fortunes of her husband affected Ohatsu's life. The registers of luxury goods dealers give an insight into the patronage and tastes of this privileged class. Being sterile, she advised her husband to take a concubine to ensure descendantship to the Kyogoku clan, however she adopted her niece, Oeyo's daughter, who would later marry Kyogoku Tadataka, son of Takatsugu.

Sekigahara 
Ohatsu's older sister was Yodo-Dono, also called Chacha. She was the concubine and the second wife of Hideyoshi; and the mother of Hideyori Toyotomi. Yodo-dono received great political power after Hideyoshi's death, because she was the heir's mother, she actually ran the Toyotomi clan after the fall of the Council of five elders. Hideyoshi's death led Japan to go to war again.

Ohatsu's younger sister, Oeyo, also known as Ogō, was the main wife of Shogun Tokugawa Hidetada and the mother of her successor Iemitsu Tokugawa. The Kyogoku clan allied with Tokugawa Ieyasu of Eastern army against Western army in Sekigahara Campaign. The Western army was led by Ishida Mitsunari and other vassals loyal to Toyotomi. Ohatsu was in the castle when the siege of Otsu occurred. Ohatsu and Oeyo were allies of the Eastern Army, their sister, Yodo-dono, was one of the prominent anti-Tokugawa (Eastern army) figures during Sekigahara and later during the siege of Osaka.

Siege of Osaka 
After the death of Ohatsu's husband in 1609, she withdrew from the world at Nozen-zan Jōkō-ji (凌霄山常高寺), A Buddhist convent in Obama (where she is now buried), taking the name Jōkō-in (常高院). However, Ohatsu remained active in the political intrigue of her time. Her family ties with the Toyotomi clan and the Tokugawa clan ensured that she served primarily as an intermediary between the two rivals. In 1614, during the winter campaign of the siege of Osaka, Ohatsu acted again as a peace negotiator and reunited with her sister, Yodo-dono. Although Yodo-dono hated the Tokugawa clan for personal reasons, she was the forerunner of a peace treaty between Toyotomi and Tokugawa.

However, in 1615, Toyotomi and Tokugawa went to war again. When Osaka castle was on fire, Yodo-dono and Toyotomi Hideyori committed suicide, thus ending the Toyotomi's legacy. Ohatsu managed to save Nāhime's life (daughter of Hideyori) and adopted her.

Death 
On September 30, 1633, Ohatsu died. Although the Kyōgoku clan moved to Izumo-Matsue a year after Ohatsu's death, her grave remained intact according to her wishes.

References

Bibliography
 Brinkley, Frank and Dairoku Kikuchi. (1915).  A History of the Japanese People from the Earliest Times to the End of the Meiji Era. Chicago: Encyclopædia Britannica Co.
 Hickman, Money L., John T. Carpenter and Bruce A. Coats. (2002).  Japan's Golden Age: Momoyama. New Haven: Yale University Press. ; OCLC 34564921
 Papinot, Edmond. (1906) Dictionnaire d'histoire et de géographie du japon. Tokyo: Librarie Sansaisha. Nobiliaire du japon (abridged version of 1906 text).

External links
 Museum of Fine Arts, Boston: Nakamura Utaemon III as Ohatsu

1570 births
1633 deaths
16th-century Japanese women
17th-century Japanese women
People of Muromachi-period Japan
People of Azuchi–Momoyama-period Japan
People of Edo-period Japan
People of Sengoku-period Japan
17th-century Japanese people
Deified Japanese people
Edo period Buddhist clergy
Japanese Buddhist nuns
17th-century Buddhist nuns
Azai clan